Matt McCoy (20 December 1923 – 20 February 2007) was an Australian professional rugby league footballer who played in the 1940s and 1950s, and an inductee of the St. George Illawarra Dragons Hall of Fame. An Australian international and New South Wales interstate representative goal-kicking centre, he played in Sydney's New South Wales Rugby Football League for the St. George club, with whom he won the 1949 NSWRFL Premiership. McCoy also played for Sydney's Eastern Suburbs club, and in Country New South Wales and Queensland as a captain-coach, representing both City and Country New South Wales, as well as Central Queensland during his career.

Playing career
Originally from Wolumla, New South Wales where he broke into the first grade rugby league team at age 15, during World War II he served as an anti-aircraft gunner and played rugby league in Darwin. After a car accident which resulted in a serious eye injury, McCoy was relocated to Sydney and started playing first grade football in the New South Wales Rugby Football League for the Eastern Suburbs club during the 1945 NSWRFL season. After the war ended he returned to the South Coast where he captain-coached Bega Roosters to premiership honours and in 1947 represented Country New South Wales against City at the Sydney Cricket Ground before a crowd of 50,000.

McCoy returned to Sydney and started playing for St. George from the 1948 NSWRFL season and in the final games of the season he captained the club. He was selected to play representative football for City NSW, kicking seven goals against Country in pouring rain in 1949.  Later that year he played for St. George in the 1949 NSWRFL season's grand final at centre, scoring a try and kicking a goal in their 19–12 victory against South Sydney. After that McCoy was selected to tour New Zealand with the Australian national team, becoming Kangaroo No. 268 and appearing in the two Test matches, scoring the match-winning try in the second one to level the series. He was the tour's top points scorer with 55 from 7 games.

A knee injury cut short McCoy's time with St. George and he didn't play any football in 1953, instead coaching St George's juniors to win their competition. After that he would play the remainder of his career as a captain-coach, moving to Queensland and joining Rockhampton's Fitzroy club. The following year McCoy played in the Riverina for Leeton's club. In 1957 he returned to Rockhampton with Fitzroy and the following year joined the Christian Brothers club. McCoy's final year of playing was in 1959 with Townsville's Centrals club.

Post playing
Following his football career, McCoy had a successful career in Sydney's cricketing competition as a batsman. In March 2004 a Legends Walk at Kogarah Oval was opened, with 16 club greats, including McCoy, inducted into a hall of fame. McCoy died in hospital at Baulkham Hills, New South Wales on 20 February 2007. In 2008, the centenary year of rugby league in Australia, McCoy was named in the Queensland Rugby League Central Division's team of the century.

References

External links
Matt McCoy at stats.rleague.com
legendsoftherealmccoy.com

1923 births
Australian military personnel of World War II
Australian rugby league players
Sydney Roosters players
City New South Wales rugby league team players
St. George Dragons players
New South Wales rugby league team players
Country New South Wales rugby league team players
Australia national rugby league team players
Australian rugby league coaches
2007 deaths
Rugby league centres